Yasmine Helmi (born November 22, 1978) is an Egyptian sport shooter. She tied for 28th place in the women's 10 metre air rifle event at the 2000 Summer Olympics.

References

1978 births
Living people
ISSF rifle shooters
Egyptian female sport shooters
Olympic shooters of Egypt
Shooters at the 2000 Summer Olympics